Thumbelina: Original Motion Picture Soundtrack is the soundtrack to the 1994 Don Bluth animated feature Thumbelina and was released on February 24, 1994. The soundtrack was composed entirely by Barry Manilow. Manilow, along with lyricists Bruce Sussman and Jack Feldman, who wrote the songs. Bluth personally approached Manilow, who had been quoted as saying he originally aspired to be a soundtrack composer, to record the album. For his part, Manilow was enthusiastic about the opportunity to score Thumbelina, as an animated film where almost the entire runtime was soundtracked.

The song "Marry The Mole", sung by Carol Channing, was the recipient of a Razzie award, making Thumbelina the first animated film to "win" a Razzie. The CD was a limited release and has been out of print since. It is also available on cassette.

The singing cast
Thumbelina - Jodi Benson
Miss (Ms.) FieldMouse - Carol Channing
Mrs. (Mama) Toad - Charo
Jacquimo - Gino Conforti
Thumbelina's Mother - Barbara Cook
Mr. Beetle - Randy Crenshaw
Prince Cornelius - Gary Imhoff
The Toads - Domenick Allen, Larry Kenton, Rick Riso
Chorus - Anúna

Track listing 

Note: The wedding reprise of "Let Me Be Your Wings" is not on the soundtrack.

References

1994 soundtrack albums
Barry Manilow soundtracks
EMI Records soundtracks
Musical film soundtracks
Fantasy film soundtracks